Salvin's prion (Pachyptila salvini), also known as the medium-billed prion, is a species of seabird in the petrel family Procellariidae.

Taxonomy
Salvin's prion is a member of the genus Pachyptila, and along with the blue petrel, they make up the prions. They in turn are members of the family Procellariidae, and the order Procellariiformes. The prions are small and typically eat just zooplankton; however as a member of the Procellariiformes, they share certain identifying features. First, they have nasal passages that attach to the upper bill called naricorns. Although the nostrils on the prion are on top of the upper bill. The bills of Procellariiformes are also unique in that they are split into between 7 and 9 horny plates. They produce a stomach oil made up of wax esters and triglycerides that is stored in the proventriculus. This is used against predators as well as an energy rich food source for chicks and for the adults during their long flights. Finally, they also have a salt gland that is situated above the nasal passage and helps desalinate their bodies, due to the high amount of ocean water that they imbibe. It excretes a high saline solution from their nose.

Etymology
Also from the Greek language,  comes from the word  meaning "a saw", which is in reference to its serrated edges of its bill. The species is named for the British ornithologist Osbert Salvin.

Description
Salvin's prion is a small  petrel with grey and white plumage, and a blue bill. Like the broad-billed prion it has lamellae in its bill in order to filter seawater for food.

Behaviour

Breeding

This small prion breeds colonially on a number of subantarctic islands in the southern Indian Ocean. The colonies of medium-billed prions are attended nocturnally in order to avoid predation by skuas. The nests are concealed in burrows usually dug into soil. Nests are attended regularly for several months prior to breeding. A single egg is laid in November or early December, which is incubated for around 50 days. Both parents share the incubation duties and feed the chick once it is hatched. The chicks fledge around 60 days after hatching.

Feeding
The main components of its diet are amphipods and krill, although it will also take fish and squid. In addition to filter feeding, food is obtained by seizing and hydroplaning.

Range and habitat
Salvin's prion breeds principally on Île aux Cochons in the Crozet Islands, where four million pairs are thought to breed. Other breeding colonies include Prince Edward Island, St Paul Island and Amsterdam Island. At sea they range from South Africa eastwards to New Zealand.

Conservation
Salvin's prion is not considered threatened with extinction. Although numbers have declined on some islands where rats and feral cats have been introduced, the world population is estimated at around 12 million birds. Consequently, they are given a classification of Least Concern.

Footnotes

References
 
 
 
 
 
 
 
 

Salvin's prion
Fauna of the Prince Edward Islands
Fauna of the Crozet Islands
Île Amsterdam
Salvin's prion
Salvin's prion
Taxonomy articles created by Polbot